|}

The Dubai Duty Free Cup is a Listed flat horse race in Great Britain open to horses aged three years or older.
It is run at Newbury over a distance of 7 furlongs (1,408 metres), and it is scheduled to take place each year in September.

The race was first run in 1997.

Records
Most successful horse (2 wins):
 Russian Revival – (1997, 1998), Tabarrak (2017, 2019)

Leading jockey (4 wins):
 Frankie Dettori – Russian Revival (1997), Meshaheer (2002), Scarf (2012), Hathal (2015)

Leading trainer (6 wins):
 Saeed bin Suroor –  Meshaheer (2002), Ashram (2009), Delegator (2010), Scarf (2012), Tawhid (2013), Silent Escape (2021)

Winners

See also
 Horse racing in Great Britain
 List of British flat horse races

References 
Racing Post: 

Flat races in Great Britain
Newbury Racecourse
Open mile category horse races
Recurring sporting events established in 1997
1997 establishments in England